Anhedoniac is the fourth studio album by rock  musician Jarboe. It was released independently in 1998.

Track listing

Personnel
Adapted from the Anhedoniac liner notes.

 Jarboe – lead vocals, bass guitar, piano, keyboards, Hammond organ, vibraphone, tape, effects, percussion, production, mixing
Musicians
 Jerry Blue, Brett Smith, Christus Snipes, Mark Spybey – effects
 Bill Bronson – bass guitar, drums
 Joseph Budenholzer – guitar
 Brian Castillo – guitar, bass guitar, drums
 Michael Evans – drums
 Brian Phrenzy – guitar, bass guitar
 Lary Seven – guitar, bass guitar

Production and additional personnel
 John Horesco III – engineering
 Richard Kern – photography
 William King III – mixing (15)
 Brian Castillo, Larry Seven -Mixing
 Pan Sonic – mixing (13)
 Phil Tan – engineering

Release history

References

External links 
 

1998 albums
Jarboe albums
Atavistic Records albums
Albums produced by Jarboe